Inés de Velasco Martínez (born 14 March 2002) is a Spanish archer. She competed in the women's individual event at the 2020 Summer Olympics.

References

External links
 
 
 
 

2002 births
Living people
Spanish female archers
Olympic archers of Spain
Archers at the 2020 Summer Olympics
Sportspeople from Madrid
21st-century Spanish women